The Nineteen Articles, officially the Nineteen Major Articles of Good Faith on the Constitution, also known as the Doctrine of Nineteen Articles and 19 Fundamental Articles, was a constitutional document, and the only constitution of the late Qing dynasty, which was promulgated by the Qing government on November 3, 1911. 

The purpose of Nineteen Articles was to establish a British-style system of ministerial responsibility, and reconstitute the Qing government as a constitutional monarchy. These articles restrained the power of the emperor and expanded the power of the congress. However, after only 3 months (February 1912) the Monarchy abolished.

See also
 Preparative Constitutionalism
 Principles of the Constitution (1908)

References 

Law in Qing dynasty
1911 in China
1911 documents
Constitution of China